WISP (1570 AM) is a radio station broadcasting a religious format. Licensed to Doylestown, Pennsylvania, United States.  The station is currently owned by Holy Spirit Radio Foundation, Inc.

History
The station went on the air in 1948. WBUX went through multiple formats throughout many years. First as a country format in the 1960s, and later to MOR in 1970, Top 40 in 1975, and back to MOR a short time later. In 1988, the station dropped its MOR format for an Adult Standards format, but would later flip to News/Talk a year later. It remained as a talk station until flipping to a 1970s music format in 1994. Three years later in 1997, the format upgraded to an oldies format. A couple of years later, the station went back to news/talk before changing its call-letters to WISP in 1999 and flipping to its current christian format.

References

External links

Radio stations established in 1948
ISP
1948 establishments in Pennsylvania